Joseph F. Hair Jr. is an American author, consultant, and professor.  Currently he serves as Distinguished Professor of Marketing, is the holder of the Cleverdon Chair of Business and Director of the PhD program at the Mitchell College of Business at the University of South Alabama. Previously he held the positions of Senior Scholar, DBA program at the Michael J. Coles College of Business at Kennesaw State University, and held the Copeland Endowed Chair of Entrepreneurship in the Ourso College of Business Administration at Louisiana Louisiana State University. He has authored over 75 editions of his books, including Multivariate Data Analysis (8th edition, 2019) (cited 135,000+ times), Essentials of Business Research Methods (2020), A Primer on Partial least Squares Structural Equation Modeling - PLS (3rd edition, 2021), and Essentials of Marketing Research (5th edition, 2020), and MKTG (13th edition, 2021). He is noted for his contributions to Marketing Research and Multivariate Data Analysis.  In 2018, 2019 and 2020 Clarivate Analytics recognized Dr. Hair as part of the top 1% of all Business and Economics professors in the world.

References

Living people
Louisiana State University faculty
Kennesaw State University faculty
Mitchell College
University of South Alabama faculty
Year of birth missing (living people)